Robert Jarvis Cochran Walker (October 20, 1838 – December 19, 1903) was a Republican member of the U.S. House of Representatives from Pennsylvania.

Robert Jarvis Cochran Walker was born near West Chester, Pennsylvania.  He attended school at East Hampton, Massachusetts, and Cambridge, Massachusetts.  He graduated from the law department of Harvard University in 1858, was admitted to the bar in 1859 and commenced practice in Philadelphia.  He served as director of the first school district of Pennsylvania, and was twice elected to the council of Philadelphia.  He purchased the Saturday Evening Post in 1874 and was its editor for a short time.  He was engaged in the production of oil.  He moved to Williamsport, Pennsylvania, in 1875 and engaged in land, lumber, and coal developments.

Walker was elected as a Republican to the Forty-seventh Congress.  He declined to be a candidate for renomination in 1882 but his name was presented by his friends.  He returned to Philadelphia in 1890 and became a manufacturing chemist.  He died in Philadelphia in 1903.  Interment in Laurel Hill Cemetery.

Sources

The Political Graveyard

Lawyers from Philadelphia
Harvard Law School alumni
1838 births
1903 deaths
Politicians from Philadelphia
The Saturday Evening Post people
Philadelphia City Council members
Republican Party members of the United States House of Representatives from Pennsylvania
19th-century American politicians